The following outline is provided as an overview of and topical guide to Mayotte

Mayotte – overseas department of France located in the Comoros Archipelago in the Indian Ocean.  The department comprises the main island of Grande-Terre (or Mahoré), a smaller island, Petite-Terre (or Pamanzi), and several islets at the northern end of the Mozambique Channel, between northern Madagascar and northern Mozambique.  The territory is geographically part of the Comoro Islands, but has been politically separate since the 1970s. The territory is also known as Mahoré, the native name of its main island, especially by advocates of its inclusion in the Union of Comoros.

General reference 

 Pronunciation:
 Common English country name:  Mayotte
 Official English country name:  Department of Mayotte
 Common endonym(s):  
 Official endonym(s):  
 Adjectival(s): Mahoran
 Demonym(s):
 ISO country codes:  YT, MYT, 175
 ISO region codes:  See ISO 3166-2:YT
 Internet country code top-level domain:  .yt

Geography of Mayotte 

Geography of Mayotte
 Mayotte is: an island, and a French overseas department
 Location:
 Eastern Hemisphere and Southern Hemisphere
 Africa (off its east coast, north and west of Madagascar)
 East Africa
 Southern Africa
 Indian Ocean
 Time zone:  East Africa Time (UTC+03)
 Extreme points of Mayotte
 High:  Benara 
 Low:  Mozambique Channel 0 m
 Land boundaries:  none
 Coastline:  Indian Ocean 185.2 km
 Population of Mayotte: 186,452 (July 31, 2007)  - —th most populous country

 Area of Mayotte: 374 km2
 Atlas of Mayotte

Environment of Mayotte 

 Climate of Mayotte
 Wildlife of Mayotte
 Fauna of Mayotte
 Mammals of Mayotte

Natural geographic features of Mayotte 

 Glaciers of Mayotte: none 
 Islands of Mayotte
 World Heritage Sites in Mayotte: None

Regions of Mayotte 

Regions of Mayotte

Ecoregions of Mayotte 

List of ecoregions in Mayotte

Administrative divisions of Mayotte 
None

Municipalities of Mayotte 

 Capital of Mayotte: Mamoudzou
 Cities of Mayotte

Demography of Mayotte 

Demographics of Mayotte

Government and politics of Mayotte 

Politics of Mayotte
 Form of government:
 Capital of Mayotte: Mamoudzou
 Elections in Mayotte
 Political parties in Mayotte

Branches of the government of Mayotte 

Government of Mayotte

Executive branch of the government of Mayotte 
 Head of state: President of Mayotte,
 Head of government: Prime Minister of Mayotte,

Legislative branch of the government of Mayotte 

 Parliament of Mayotte (bicameral)
 Upper house: Senate of Mayotte
 Lower house: House of Commons of Mayotte

Judicial branch of the government of Mayotte 

Court system of Mayotte

Foreign relations of Mayotte 

Foreign relations of Mayotte
 Diplomatic missions of Mayotte

International organization membership 
The Departmental Collectivity of Mayotte is a member of:
Indian Ocean Commission (InOC)
Universal Postal Union (UPU)
World Federation of Trade Unions (WFTU)

Law and order in Mayotte 

Law of Mayotte
 Human rights in Mayotte
 LGBT rights in Mayotte

Military of Mayotte 

Military of Mayotte
 Command
 Commander-in-chief:
 Forces

Local government in Mayotte 

Local government in Mayotte

History of Mayotte 

History of Mayotte
Current events of Mayotte

Culture of Mayotte 

Culture of Mayotte
 Languages of Mayotte
 National symbols of Mayotte
 Coat of arms of Mayotte
 Flag of Mayotte
 Religion in Mayotte
 Islam in Mayotte
 Sikhism in Mayotte
 World Heritage Sites in Mayotte: None

Art in Mayotte 
 Music of Mayotte

Sports in Mayotte 

Sports in Mayotte
 Football in Mayotte

Economy and infrastructure of Mayotte 

Economy of Mayotte
 Economic rank, by nominal GDP (2007):
 Communications in Mayotte
 Internet in Mayotte
 Companies of Mayotte
Currency of Mayotte: Euro (see also: Euro topics)
ISO 4217: EUR
 Transport in Mayotte
 Airports in Mayotte
 Rail transport in Mayotte

Education in Mayotte 

Education in Mayotte

See also 

Mayotte
List of international rankings
List of Mayotte-related topics
Outline of Africa
Outline of France
Outline of geography

References

External links 

CIA World Factbook - Mayotte
IleMayotte.com The Mayotte Portal 

WorldStatesmen- Mayotte

 Analysis of the linguistic situation on Mayotte
"Voyages...Visages" - Another way of travelling and seeing
Comité du tourisme de Mayotte Official tourism website 

 
 
Mayotte